Mikhail Yunkov (born February 16, 1986, in Voskresensk, USSR) is a Russian professional ice hockey forward who is currently under contract with Khimik Voskresensk in the Supreme Hockey League (VHL). Yunko has appeared in over 500 games in the  Kontinental Hockey League (KHL). In the 2004 NHL Entry Draft, Mikhail was drafted 62nd overall in the 2nd round by the Washington Capitals. He is the brother of Alexander Yunkov, who also played ice hockey professionally.

Career statistics

Regular season and playoffs

International

Awards and honours

References

External links

RussianProspects.com Mikhail Yunkov Profile

1986 births
Russian ice hockey centres
Ak Bars Kazan players
Avangard Omsk players
HC CSKA Moscow players
HC Spartak Moscow players
Krylya Sovetov Moscow players
Living people
Metallurg Magnitogorsk players
Salavat Yulaev Ufa players
Severstal Cherepovets players
HC Sochi players
Washington Capitals draft picks
People from Voskresensk
Sportspeople from Moscow Oblast